Tommy Pranata (born in  Padang, West Sumatra, December 12, 1982) is an Indonesian footballer who plays  as a midfielder.

Honours

Club
Persisam Samarinda
 Liga Indonesia Premier Division: 2008–09

Arema Indonesia
 Indonesia Super League: 2009–10

References

External links
   Profile Tommy Pranata
 

Living people
1982 births
Indonesian footballers
PSMS Medan players
People from Padang
Association football midfielders
Sportspeople from West Sumatra